Photoleukomelanodermatitis of Kobori is a cutaneous condition, a dyschromic drug eruption that occurs after ingestion of afloqualone, thiazides or tetracyclines, followed by exposure to sunlight.

See also 
 Leukotriene receptor antagonist-associated Churg–Strauss syndrome
 List of cutaneous conditions

References 

Drug eruptions
Disturbances of human pigmentation